Amran Al-Jassasi (born 11 March 1996), is an Omani professional footballer who plays as a full back for Al-Nasr.

Career statistics

Club

Notes

References

1996 births
Living people
Omani footballers
Omani expatriate footballers
Association football fullbacks
A Lyga players
FC Stumbras players
UAE Pro League players
Khor Fakkan Sports Club players
Al Jazira Club players
Al Ain FC players
Sharjah FC players
Al Dhafra FC players
Al-Nasr SC (Dubai) players
Omani expatriate sportspeople in Lithuania
Expatriate footballers in Lithuania
Omani expatriate sportspeople in the United Arab Emirates
Expatriate footballers in the United Arab Emirates